Nana Steenssens (born 28 October 1974) is a former Belgian racing cyclist. She finished in second place in the Belgian National Road Race Championships in 2008.

References

External links

1974 births
Living people
Belgian female cyclists
Cyclists from Antwerp